New Westminster is a provincial electoral district for the Legislative Assembly of British Columbia, Canada. It is the only electoral district in British Columbia to have existed for every general election.

The riding is notable for a couple of reasons. It never voted for a Social Credit candidate during the Socred's era of dominance between 1952 and 1991. It was also represented by Byron Ingemar Johnson, the 24th Premier of British Columbia.

During the 1990s, the riding was represented by Anita Hagen, who served as Deputy Premier of British Columbia and Minister of Education from 1991 to 1993 during the premiership of Mike Harcourt. Hagen was replaced by Graeme Bowbrick in 1996, who served as Minister of Advanced Education in 2000, and Attorney General from 2000 to 2001.

Members of the Legislative Assembly of British Columbia
Its MLA is Jennifer Whiteside. She was first elected in 2020. She is a member of the British Columbia New Democratic Party.

Election results

2020

2017

2013

2009

2005

2001

|- bgcolor="white"
!align="right" colspan=3|Total Valid Votes
!align="right"|22,475
!align="right"|100.00%
!align="right"|
!align="right"|
|- bgcolor="white"
!align="right" colspan=3|Total Rejected Ballots
!align="right"|113
!align="right"|0.50%
!align="right"|
!align="right"|
|- bgcolor="white"
!align="right" colspan=3|Turnout
!align="right"|22,588
!align="right"|71.07%
!align="right"|
!align="right"|

1996

|- bgcolor="white"
!align="right" colspan=3|Total Valid Votes
!align="right"|22,313
!align="right"|100.00%
!align="right"|
!align="right"|
|- bgcolor="white"
!align="right" colspan=3|Total Rejected Ballots
!align="right"|133
!align="right"|0.59%
!align="right"|
!align="right"|
|- bgcolor="white"
!align="right" colspan=3|Turnout
!align="right"|22,446
!align="right"|70.41%
!align="right"|
!align="right"|

1991

|- bgcolor="white" 	 
!align="right" colspan=3|Total Valid Votes 	 
!align="right"|20,812 	 
!align="right"|100.00% 	 
!align="right"| 	 
!align="right"| 	 
|- bgcolor="white" 	 
!align="right" colspan=3|Total Rejected Ballots 	 
!align="right"|395 	 
!align="right"|1.86% 	 
!align="right"| 	 
!align="right"| 	 
|- bgcolor="white" 	 
!align="right" colspan=3|Turnout 	 
!align="right"|21,207 	 
!align="right"|72.32% 	 
!align="right"| 	 
!align="right"|

1986

1983

|- bgcolor="white"
!align="right" colspan=3|Total valid votes
!align="right"|20,269 
!align="right"|100.00%
!align="right"|
|- bgcolor="white"
!align="right" colspan=3|Total rejected ballots
!align="right"|233
!align="right"|
!align="right"|
|- bgcolor="white"
!align="right" colspan=3|Turnout
!align="right"|%
!align="right"|
!align="right"|

1979

|- bgcolor="white"
!align="right" colspan=3|Total valid votes
!align="right"|19,129
!align="right"|100.00%
!align="right"|
|- bgcolor="white"
!align="right" colspan=3|Total rejected ballots
!align="right"|292
!align="right"|
!align="right"|
|- bgcolor="white"
!align="right" colspan=3|Turnout
!align="right"|%
!align="right"|
!align="right"|

1975

|- bgcolor="white"
!align="right" colspan=3|Total valid votes
!align="right"|19,106 	
!align="right"|100.00%
!align="right"|
|- bgcolor="white"
!align="right" colspan=3|Total rejected ballots
!align="right"|166
!align="right"|
!align="right"|
|- bgcolor="white"
!align="right" colspan=3|Turnout
!align="right"|%
!align="right"|
!align="right"|

1972

|- bgcolor="white"
!align="right" colspan=3|Total valid votes
!align="right"|18,616 
!align="right"|100.00%
!align="right"|
|- bgcolor="white"
!align="right" colspan=3|Total rejected ballots
!align="right"|287
!align="right"|
!align="right"|
|- bgcolor="white"
!align="right" colspan=3|Turnout
!align="right"|%
!align="right"|
!align="right"|

1969

|- bgcolor="white"
!align="right" colspan=3|Total valid votes
!align="right"|17,866
!align="right"|100.00%
!align="right"|
|- bgcolor="white"
!align="right" colspan=3|Total rejected ballots
!align="right"|221
!align="right"|
!align="right"|
|- bgcolor="white"
!align="right" colspan=3|Turnout
!align="right"|%
!align="right"|
!align="right"|

1966

|- bgcolor="white"
!align="right" colspan=3|Total valid votes
!align="right"|12,880 	
!align="right"|100.00%
!align="right"|
|- bgcolor="white"
!align="right" colspan=3|Total rejected ballots
!align="right"|160
!align="right"|
!align="right"|
|- bgcolor="white"
!align="right" colspan=3|Turnout
!align="right"|%
!align="right"|
!align="right"|

1963

|- bgcolor="white"
!align="right" colspan=3|Total valid votes
!align="right"|13,403
!align="right"|100.00%
!align="right"|
|- bgcolor="white"
!align="right" colspan=3|Total rejected ballots
!align="right"|98
!align="right"|
!align="right"|
|- bgcolor="white"
!align="right" colspan=3|Turnout
!align="right"|%
!align="right"|
!align="right"|

1960

|- bgcolor="white"
!align="right" colspan=3|Total valid votes
!align="right"|15,747
!align="right"|100.00%
!align="right"|
|- bgcolor="white"
!align="right" colspan=3|Total rejected ballots
!align="right"|127
!align="right"|
!align="right"|
|- bgcolor="white"
!align="right" colspan=3|Turnout
!align="right"|%
!align="right"|
!align="right"|

1956

1953

1952

1949

1945

|- bgcolor="white"
!align="right" colspan=3|Total valid votes
!align="right"|8,462 	
!align="right"|100.00%
!align="right"|
|- bgcolor="white"
!align="right" colspan=3|Total rejected ballots
!align="right"|94
!align="right"|
!align="right"|
|- bgcolor="white"
!align="right" colspan=3|Turnout
!align="right"|%
!align="right"|
!align="right"|
|- bgcolor="white"
!align="right" colspan=7|8 23rd Premier of British Columbia

1941

|- bgcolor="white"
!align="right" colspan=3|Total valid votes
!align="right"|8,849 	
!align="right"|100.00%
!align="right"|
|- bgcolor="white"
!align="right" colspan=3|Total rejected ballots
!align="right"|178
!align="right"|
!align="right"|
|- bgcolor="white"
!align="right" colspan=3|Turnout
!align="right"|%
!align="right"|
!align="right"|

1937

|- bgcolor="white"
!align="right" colspan=3|Total valid votes
!align="right"|7,795 	
!align="right"|100.00%
!align="right"|
|- bgcolor="white"
!align="right" colspan=3|Total rejected ballots
!align="right"|116
!align="right"|
!align="right"|
|- bgcolor="white"
!align="right" colspan=3|Turnout
!align="right"|%
!align="right"|
!align="right"|

1933

|- bgcolor="white"
!align="right" colspan=3|Total valid votes
!align="right"| 5,734 	
!align="right"|100.00%
!align="right"|
|- bgcolor="white"
!align="right" colspan=3|Total rejected ballots
!align="right"|67
!align="right"|
!align="right"|
|- bgcolor="white"
!align="right" colspan=3|Turnout
!align="right"|%
!align="right"|
!align="right"|
|- bgcolor="white"
!align="right" colspan=7|1   Endorsed by the Independent CCF.

1928

|- bgcolor="white"
!align="right" colspan=3|Total valid votes
!align="right"|5,808
!align="right"|100.00%
!align="right"|
|- bgcolor="white"
!align="right" colspan=3|Total rejected ballots
!align="right"|205
!align="right"|
!align="right"|
|- bgcolor="white"
!align="right" colspan=3|Turnout
!align="right"|%
!align="right"|
!align="right"|
|- bgcolor="white"
!align="right" colspan=7|6  <small>"Wells Gray", namesake and instigator of the provincial park of that name in the Cariboo Mountains.

1924

|- bgcolor="white"
!align="right" colspan=3|Total valid votes
!align="right"|4,158 
!align="right"|100.00%
!align="right"|
|- bgcolor="white"
!align="right" colspan=3|Total rejected ballots
!align="right"|
!align="right"|
!align="right"|
|- bgcolor="white"
!align="right" colspan=3|Turnout
!align="right"|%
!align="right"|
!align="right"|
|-

1920

1916

|- bgcolor="white"
!align="right" colspan=3|Total valid votes
!align="right"|2,555
!align="right"|100.00%
|- bgcolor="white"
!align="right" colspan=3|Total rejected ballots
!align="right"|
!align="right"|
|- bgcolor="white"
!align="right" colspan=3|Turnout
!align="right"|%
!align="right"|
|-

1875

References

British Columbia provincial electoral districts
New Westminster
Provincial electoral districts in Greater Vancouver and the Fraser Valley